The 1980 NCAA Division III football season, part of college football in the United States organized by the National Collegiate Athletic Association at the Division III level, began in August 1980, and concluded with the NCAA Division III Football Championship in December 1980 at Garrett-Harrison Stadium in Phenix City, Alabama. The Dayton Flyers won their first Division III championship, defeating the defending national champion Ithaca Bombers by a final score of 63−0.

Conference changes and new programs

Conference standings

Conference champions

Postseason
The 1980 NCAA Division III Football Championship playoffs were the eighth annual single-elimination tournament to determine the national champion of men's NCAA Division III college football. The championship game was held at Garrett-Harrison Stadium in Phenix City, Alabama for the eighth consecutive year. Like the previous five championships, eight teams competed in this edition.

Playoff bracket

See also
1980 NCAA Division I-A football season
1980 NCAA Division I-AA football season
1980 NCAA Division II football season
1980 NAIA Division I football season
1980 NAIA Division II football season

References